The 1954–55 Honduran Amateur League was the eighth edition of the Honduran Amateur League.  C.D. Abacá obtained its 1st national title.  The season ran from 28 February 1954 to 20 March 1955.

Regional champions

Known results

National championship round
Played in a double round-robin format between the regional champions.  Also known as the Cuadrangular.

Results

Abacá's lineup

References

Liga Amateur de Honduras seasons
Honduras
1954 in Honduras
1955 in Honduras